This is a list of Yugoslav regents. A regent, from the Latin regens "one who reigns", is a person selected to act as head of state (ruling or not) because the ruler is a minor, not present, or debilitated.

Regent for King Peter I

Regent for King Peter II

Notes and references 

Regents
Regents